Roman Pichler can refer to:

 Roman Pichler (footballer)
 Roman Pichler (luger)